Lucy Williams is a swimmer.

Lucy Williams may also refer to:
Lucy Gwendolen Williams, British sculptor and painter
Lucy Ariel Williams, American poet
Lucy Williams (golfer) in 2014 U.S. Women's Open
Lucy Williams (EastEnders), EastEnders character
Lucie Campbell-Williams, married name Lucie Williams